Partecosta is a genus of sea snails in the family Terebridae (subfamily Pervicaciinae), the auger snails. They are found in the Indian Ocean in intertidal and shallow subtidal areas.

Species
Species within the genus Partecosta include:
 Partecosta albofuscata (Bozzetti, 2008)
 Partecosta arabica Terryn, Rosado & Gori, 2020
 Partecosta aurata Gargiulo, 2021
 Partecosta bertini Terryn, 2021
 Partecosta bozzettii Malcolm, Terryn & Fedosov, 2020
 Partecosta brunneanebulosa Terryn, Rosado & Gori, 2020
 Partecosta fuscobasis (E. A. Smith, 1877)
 Partecosta fuscocincta (E. A. Smith, 1877)
 Partecosta fuscolutea (Bozzetti, 2008)
 Partecosta herosae (Terryn & Rosado, 2011)
 Partecosta keppensi Terryn, Rosado & Gori, 2020
 Partecosta macandrewii (E. A. Smith, 1877)
 Partecosta macleani (Bratcher, 1988)
 Partecosta nassoides (Hinds, 1844)
 Partecosta olivacea Terryn, Rosado & Gori, 2020
 Partecosta padangensis (Thiele, 1925)
 Partecosta sandrinae (Aubry, 2008)
 Partecosta tantilla (E. A. Smith, 1873)
 Partecosta tenera (Hinds, 1844)
 Partecosta trilineata (Bozzetti, 2008)
 Partecosta varia (Bozzetti, 2008)
 Partecosta veliae (Aubry, 1991)
Species brought into synonymy
 Partecosta marqueti (Aubry, 1994): synonym of Hastula marqueti (Aubry, 1994)

References

External links
 Dance S.P. & Eames F.E. (1966). New molluscs from the recent Hammar formation of South-East Iraq. Proceedings of the Malacological Society of London. 37(1): 35-43
 Fedosov, A. E.; Malcolm, G.; Terryn, Y.; Gorson, J.; Modica, M. V.; Holford, M.; Puillandre, N. (2020). Phylogenetic classification of the family Terebridae (Neogastropoda: Conoidea). Journal of Molluscan Studies. 85(4): 359-388

Terebridae